Russia! magazine is an English-language publication about Russia, published quarterly by US-based company Press Release Group.

The first issue, released in February 2007, had 132 pages and its topics ranged from homosexuality to the issue of free speech. It was distributed in the US, UK and Russia. Design and art-direction of the first issue of the magazine was done by Art. Lebedev Studio.

The magazine is distributed in the US, UK, Sweden, Russia and around the world. It is sold in Barnes & Noble stores, Borders and other locations.

It was named one of the best new magazines of 2007 by Library Journal. Russia! magazine was published online until 2016.

History
Russia! magazine was founded in 2007 by Ilya Merenzon and Andrew Paulson. The founding editor, Michael Thompson, was replaced after a single issue with Michael Idov, a contributing editor at New York Magazine. Under Idov, 'Russia!' took on a more humorous sensibility.

References

External links 
 Magazine website
 Library Journal

Magazines established in 2007
Political magazines published in the United States
Quarterly magazines published in the United States